Salers is a commune in the Cantal department in south-central France.

It is famous for the Appellation d'Origine Contrôlée (AOC) cheeses Cantal and Salers. It is also famous for the Salers breed of cattle that originated in this commune.

It was pillaged by Rodrigo de Villandrando in the late 1430s, during the final phase of the Hundred Years' War.

Population

See also
Communes of the Cantal department

References

Communes of Cantal
Plus Beaux Villages de France
Cantal communes articles needing translation from French Wikipedia